Akehurst is an old English name derived from "ake," meaning oak, and "hurst," meaning "a grove of trees."  The name likely comes from the modern town of Oakhurst, once called "Acersc."  The name is primarily found in the Sussex area of England.

Notable people with the surname include:

 Elizabeth Akehurst (born 1975), South African cricketer
 John Akehurst (1930–2007), British Army officer
 John Akehurst, American fashion photographer
 Len and Dorothy Akehurst, founders of Doomadgee Mission in Queensland, Australia
 Michael Barton Akehurst (1940–1989), British lawyer and author

See also 
 Akhurst
 Wakehurst

References 

English-language surnames